Juha-Pekka Pietilä (born April 30, 1991) is a Finnish professional ice hockey player who played with Pelicans in the SM-liiga during the 2010–11 season.

References

External links

1991 births
Finnish ice hockey defencemen
Lahti Pelicans players
Living people
People from Hollola
Sportspeople from Päijät-Häme